In epidemiology and demography, age adjustment, also called age standardization, is a technique used to allow statistical populations to be compared when the age profiles of the populations are quite different.

Example
For example, in 2004/5, two Australian health surveys investigated rates of long-term circulatory system health problems (e.g. heart disease) in the general Australian population, and specifically in the Indigenous Australian population. In each age category over age 24, Indigenous Australians had markedly higher rates of circulatory disease than the general population: 5% vs 2% in age group 25–34, 12% vs 4% in age group 35–44, 22% vs 14% in age group 45–54, and 42% vs 33% in age group 55+.

However, overall, these surveys estimated that 12% of all Indigenous Australians had long-term circulatory problems compared to 18% of the overall Australian population.

To understand this "apparent contradiction", we note that this only includes age groups over 24 and ignores those under. Indigenous figures are dominated by the younger age groups, which have lower rates of circulatory disease; this masks the fact that their risk at each age is higher than for non-Indigenous peers of the same age, if you simply pretend that no Indigenous people are under 24.

Weighting
To get a more informative comparison between the two populations, a weighting approach is used. Older groups in the Indigenous population are weighted more heavily (to match their prevalence in the "reference population", i.e. the overall Australian population) and younger groups less heavily. This gives an "age-adjusted" morbidity rate approximately 30% higher than that for the general population, indicating that Indigenous Australians have a higher risk of circulatory disease. (Note that some residual distortion remains due to the wide age bands being used.) This is directly analogous to the standardized mortality ratio for mortality statistics.

To adjust for age under this direct method of standardization, age-specific rates in each group must be calculated, as well as the age structure of the standard population.

Standard populations

In order to adjust for age, a standard population must be selected. Some agencies which produce health statistics also publish standard populations for age adjustment.  Standard populations have been developed for specific countries and regions.  World standard populations have also been developed to compare data from different countries, including the Segi World Standard and the World Health Organization (WHO) standard. These agencies must balance between setting weights which may be used over a long period of time, which maximizes comparability of published statistics, and revising weights to be close to the current age distribution. When comparing data from a specific country or region, using a standard population from that country or region means that the age-adjusted rates are similar to the true population rates.  On the other hand, standardizing data using a widely used standard such as the WHO standard population allows for easier comparison with published statistics.

When is it used
Age adjustment is commonly used when comparing prevalences in different populations. It is not used to derive life expectancy, which is calculated directly from the age-specific mortality rates, with no reference population required.

Age adjustment is also not appropriate when attempting to compare population totals (for instance, if we wanted to know the total number of hospital beds required for patients with circulatory diseases).

See also

References

Further reading

Epidemiology
Design of experiments
Demography
Ageism